Chondroitin sulfate proteoglycan 5 is a protein that in humans is encoded by the CSPG5 gene.

Interactions
CSPG5 has been shown to interact with GOPC.

References

Further reading

External links